HMS Swallow was a 50-gun fourth rate ship of the line of the Royal Navy, built at Deptford Dockyard and launched on 10 February 1703.

Swallow was rebuilt according to the 1706 Establishment at Chatham Dockyard, and was relaunched on 25 March 1719. Captain Chaloner Ogle commanded Swallow off the West African coast from 1721 and the following year engaged and defeated several pirate ships. Their commander Bartholomew Roberts was killed, and Ogle received a knighthood for his actions. Swallow continued to serve until 1728, when she was broken up.

Notes

References

Lavery, Brian (2003) The Ship of the Line - Volume 1: The development of the battlefleet 1650-1850. Conway Maritime Press. .

Captured ships
Ships of the line of the Royal Navy
1700s ships